Musculus is a genus of mussels in the family Mytilidae.

Selected species
 Musculus discors (Linnaeus, 1767) — discord mussel
 Musculus lateralis (Say, 1822) — lateral mussel
 Musculus niger (Gray, 1824) — little black mussel
 †Musculus somaliensis Cox, 1935

References

 
Bivalve genera